Pseudochazara pallida is a species of butterfly in the family Nymphalidae. It is confined to the southern and eastern Altai.

Flight period 
The species is univoltine and is on wing from July to August.

Food plants
Larvae feed on grasses.

References

 Satyrinae of the Western Palearctic - Pseudochazara pallida

Pseudochazara
Butterflies described in 1901